Milan Kubala (18 June 1946 – 14 March 2020) was a Paralympic athlete from the Czech Republic competing mainly in category F36 shot put and discus events.

Milan competed at three Paralympics, winning a silver in the discus in 1996 and then gold in both 2000 and 2004. He also won gold at the 1998 IPC Athletics World Championships and silver at the 2002 competition.

References

1946 births
2020 deaths
Paralympic athletes of the Czech Republic
Athletes (track and field) at the 1996 Summer Paralympics
Athletes (track and field) at the 2000 Summer Paralympics
Athletes (track and field) at the 2004 Summer Paralympics
Paralympic gold medalists for the Czech Republic
Paralympic silver medalists for the Czech Republic
Medalists at the 1996 Summer Paralympics
Medalists at the 2000 Summer Paralympics
Medalists at the 2004 Summer Paralympics
Paralympic medalists in athletics (track and field)
Czech male discus throwers
People from Frýdek-Místek
Sportspeople from the Moravian-Silesian Region